Maksim Sergeyevich Dyldin (born 19 May 1987) is a Russian sprint athlete. He was part of the team that finished third in Men's 4 × 400 m relay at the 2008 Summer Olympics, but the team was disqualified after teammate Denis Alekseyev tested positive for doping.

Dyldin himself was disqualified for four years for refusing to be tested. His ban extends from 22 May 2015 to 5 January 2021.

See also
List of doping cases in athletics
List of stripped European Athletics Championships medals
List of World Athletics Championships medalists (men)
4 × 400 metres relay at the World Championships in Athletics

References

External links
 
 Athlete bio at 2008 Olympics website

1987 births
Living people
Sportspeople from Perm, Russia
Russian male sprinters
Olympic male sprinters
Olympic athletes of Russia
Athletes (track and field) at the 2008 Summer Olympics
Athletes (track and field) at the 2012 Summer Olympics
Competitors stripped of Summer Olympics medals
World Athletics Championships athletes for Russia
European Athletics Championships winners
European Athletics Championships medalists
Russian Athletics Championships winners
Doping cases in athletics
Russian sportspeople in doping cases